Maryland Route 472 (MD 472) is a state highway in the U.S. state of Maryland.  Known as North Sandgates Road, the state highway runs  from MD 235 in Oakville north to Sandgates Creek in Sandgates.  MD 472 was built in 1933.

Route description

MD 472 begins at an intersection with MD 235 (Three Notch Road) in Oakville.  The state highway heads northeast as a two-lane undivided road through farmland and forest with scattered residences.  After passing the historic home Sandgates On Cat Creek, MD 472 enters the beach community of Sandgates on the Patuxent River.  The state highway reaches its northern terminus at the west end of the county-maintained wooden-floored bridge over Sandgates Creek.  The roadway continues south as South Sandgates Road, a county highway that connects back with MD 235 in Hillville.

History
MD 472 was constructed in 1933.  Aside from repaving, the state highway has changed very little since then.

Junction list

See also

References

External links

MDRoads: MD 472

472
Maryland Route 472